is a Japanese diver, who specialized in springboard and platform events. He had won two bronze medals for the springboard diving at the 2006 Asian Games in Doha, Qatar, in addition to his first at the 2001 FINA World Championships in Fukuoka.

Terauchi has represented Japan in Six Olympic Games (1996 in Atlanta, 2000 in Sydney, 2004 in Athens, 2008 in Beijing, 2016 in Rio de Janeiro and 2021 in Tokyo). He reached into the finals for all of his respective events but the 2016 Olympics one, although he never captured a single Olympic medal. His best result was further achieved at the 2000 Summer Olympics in Sydney, when he placed fifth in the men's 10 m platform, with a cumulative score of 636.90 points.

Terauchi retired temporarily in 2009, and worked as an employee for sports manufacturing company Mizuno. A year later, he resumed training to set sights for his fifth Olympics, and made his comeback by placing second at a domestic meet. In 2012, Terauchi had received a qualifying berth at the FINA Diving World Cup, but Japan Swimming Federation decided not to send him to London for the Summer Olympics, despite that he was not able to perform well against the world's top divers.

Terauchi is a graduate of clinical psychology at Koshien University in Takarazuka, Hyōgo.

Terauchi is currently the oldest diver in Olympic history, and the first diver to have appeared in six different Olympic Games.

References

External links
NBC 2008 Olympics profile

Japanese male divers
Living people
Olympic divers of Japan
Divers at the 1996 Summer Olympics
Divers at the 2000 Summer Olympics
Divers at the 2004 Summer Olympics
Divers at the 2008 Summer Olympics
Divers at the 2016 Summer Olympics
People from Takasago, Hyōgo
1980 births
Asian Games medalists in diving
Divers at the 1994 Asian Games
Divers at the 1998 Asian Games
Divers at the 2006 Asian Games
Divers at the 2014 Asian Games
Divers at the 2018 Asian Games
World Aquatics Championships medalists in diving
Asian Games bronze medalists for Japan
Sportspeople from Hyōgo Prefecture
Medalists at the 2006 Asian Games
Medalists at the 2018 Asian Games
Universiade medalists in diving
Universiade silver medalists for Japan
Medalists at the 1999 Summer Universiade
Medalists at the 2001 Summer Universiade
Medalists at the 2003 Summer Universiade
Divers at the 2020 Summer Olympics
21st-century Japanese people